GMM Grammy Public Company Limited ( or G"MM' Grammy) is the largest media conglomerate entertainment company in Thailand. Grammy top artists include Bird Thongchai, Silly Fools, Loso, Tai Orathai, Bie Sukrit, Tata Young, Mos Patiparn, Bodyslam, Getsunova, Joey Boy,... In addition to its music business, the company is involved in concert production, artist management, film and television production and publishing.

Major shareholders

Music
The company has twelve music subsidiaries:
 Genie Records – Pop/rock records
 Grammy Gold – Thai country records (luk thung)
 Grammy Big – Compilation records
 Sanamluang Music – Indie records
 White Music – Pop records
 GMMTV RECORDS – Pop/ost records
 One Music – Pop/ost records
 Genelab – Pop/rock records
 Thaidol Music – Thai northeast country records (Mor lam)
 White Fox – Pop idol records
 GNEST – Pop idol records
 YGMM – Pop idol records

GMMTV RECORDS is under GMM Channel Digital TV department and One Music are under GMM One Digital TV department.
Manufacturing and distribution comes under MGA Co. Ltd., while the Imagine record store chain is a company-owned retailer. Music publishing is handled by GMM Music Publishing International Co., Ltd., while GMM Grammy licensed karaoke music and equipment is handled by Clean Karaoke.

List of GMM Grammy artists
Current artists in the GMM Grammy label include (incomplete list):

Past artists in the GMM Grammy label include (incomplete list):

Media

Film
GMM Grammy has conducted business in the film industry through various subsidiary studios: Grammy Film (1995–2000), GMM Pictures (2002–2004), GMM Tai Hub (GTH, 2004–2015), and GDH 559 (2016–present). Grammy Film and GMM Pictures were wholly owned subsidiaries, while GTH was formed in 2004 as a joint venture with Tai Entertainment and Hub Ho Hin Bangkok, following their successful 2003 co-production My Girl. GMM Grammy owns a 51% stake in GDH 559, which was formed in 2016 as GTH's successor following disagreements which led to the departure of Tai Entertainment.

GMM Z
GMM Z Co., Ltd. is a subsidiary of GMM Grammy that produces and distributes satellite television set-top boxes airing free-to-air channels and its own content.

It formerly operated Z PAY TV, a pay television platform offering premium and exclusive content such as German Bundesliga, UEFA Euro 2012, and channels from FOX International Channels before it was sold to CTH.

Television
GMM Grammy has 2 digital television channels:
 One 31 Channel 31 (high definition) 
 GMM 25 Channel 25 (standard definition)

Production marques, studios which produce lakorns, TV series, TV shows, game shows and variety shows, including:
 A-Time Media
 CHANGE 2561 (with Adelfos Co Ltd and Saithip Montrikul Na Audhaya)
 GMM Channel (Owner of GMM 25)
 GDH 559
 GMMTV
 GMM Bravo
 Me Mi Ti
 Nadao Bangkok
 The One Enterprise (Owner of One 31, merged from GMM One TV, Exact, and Scenario)

Radio
Atime Media, a subsidiary of GMM Grammy, operates the following stations:
 Chill FM Online
 EFM 94
 Green Wave 106.5 FM
 Hot 91.5 (disbanded in 2013)

Publishing

Magazines
Magazines produced by GMM Grammy include:
 Image – Fashion, beauty, society news.
 Madame Figaro Magazine – Fashion and beauty "targeting sophisticated and highly educated women who do not need 'how to'".
 Her World – The Thai edition of the popular Singaporean women's magazine.
 Maxim – The Thai edition of the popular lad mag.
 Attitude – The Thai edition of the British gay lifestyle magazine.
 In Magazine – Fashion and Entertainment

Newspapers
GMM Grammy has partial stakes in the Bangkok Post and the Matichon Group, which publishes several Thai-language dailies, including Matichon and Khao Sod.

Distribution
 Se-Education PLC – A chain of university bookstores.

See also
 Media of Thailand
 List of record labels: 0-9

References

External links

 GMMTV
 GDH559 – GDH 559.
 ฟังเพลง – GMM Grammy's Entertainment Web Portal.
 GMM Grammy at the Stock Exchange of Thailand.

 
Mass media companies of Thailand
Thai record labels
Record labels established in 1983
Pop record labels
Rock record labels
Conglomerate companies of Thailand
Entertainment companies of Thailand
Entertainment companies established in 1983
Companies listed on the Stock Exchange of Thailand
1983 establishments in Thailand